WJZR (105.9 FM) is a radio station in Rochester, New York, United States. It is owned by the WXXI Public Broadcasting Council, Rochester's primary public broadcaster. The station was started in January 1993 by North Coast Radio, Inc., and broadcast a smooth jazz format for 29 years before it was taken silent in July 2022. WXXI plans to use the frequency to carry its news/talk service, currently heard only on AM.

North Coast Radio
In November 1988, the Federal Communications Commission (FCC) designated a series of 14 applications for comparative hearing in order to determine who should be awarded a construction permit to build a new radio station on 105.9 MHz in Rochester. The commission awarded the permit to R. B. Lee Rust in December 1991. Rust was a second-generation station owner in Rochester; his father, Bill, had owned WHAM.

WJZR began broadcasting on January 22, 1993, with an eclectic jazz format. It was the second station Rust had managed with such a format, having set WGMC in Greece into the format previously in the 1990s. Rust's own personal music collection set the tone for WJZR; he categorized songs by such factors as attitude and so-called "thump". Rust also took the name North Coast Radio—which had been initially intended to refer only to the licensee—and used it as the station's overall brand instead of a set of call letters, feeling that it "makes Rochester sound more attractive, not just a cold, nondescript place". The station also set itself apart by airing no prerecorded commercials; the station's air staff read commercials live, and there were only six such ads an hour. Rapid consolidation of Rochester commercial radio stations meant that WJZR and Black-owned WDKX were the only independent outlets in the city by 1998; Rust rebuffed offers to sell his station.

By 2013, WJZR was a completely automated operation, with Rust as chief engineer, programmer, and the station's imaging voice; its commercial status made it more unusual as the number of full-time jazz outlets dwindled yet Rochester still had two stations in the format. Rust's extensive involvement in multiple facets of station operations also kept costs low. After 29 years, Rust announced he would retire and take the station silent; the last song on WJZR, played on the evening of July 10, 2022, was "In a Silent Way" by Miles Davis.

Sale to WXXI
On October 7, 2022, the WXXI Public Broadcasting Council announced it would purchase WJZR from Rust. The $1.2 million deal is structured as a $675,000 payment as well as an additional $525,000 donation by Rust to WXXI; the acquisition was completed on January 24, 2023. WXXI intends to return the station to service in 2023 on a noncommercial basis as the first FM frequency for its news/talk programming, currently heard only on WXXI (1370 AM), with a new call sign likely to be selected at that time.

References

External links

JZR
Jazz in New York (state)
Radio stations established in 1993
1993 establishments in New York (state)